Sydney Beckwith "Syd" Anderson (12 March 1884 – 1 August 1954) was an Australian rules footballer who played with Melbourne in the Victorian Football League (VFL).

Notes

External links 

 
Demonwiki profile

1884 births
1954 deaths
Australian rules footballers from Victoria (Australia)
Melbourne Football Club players